Langat virus (LGTV) is a virus of the genus Flavivirus. The virus was first isolated in Malaysia in 1956 from a hard tick of the Ixodes genus. This virus is antigenically related to Omsk hemorrhagic fever virus, Kyasanur forest disease virus, Alkhurma virus, Louping ill virus and other viruses of the   tick-borne encephalitis virus (TBEV) complex. The Langat virus does not pose a significant epidemiological threat in comparison with TBEV. There are no known cases of human diseases associated with LGTV. The Malaysian strain (LGT strain TP21, also known as the Yelantsev virus) is naturally attenuated and induces neutralizing antibodies to tick-borne encephalitis virus (TBEV) and protection against other TBEV complex viruses in animals.

LGTV-based vaccine

In the 1970s a live attenuate LGTV-based vaccine against tick-borne encephalitis was made. At the same time, another vaccine was tested, but the group vaccinated with the LGTV-based vaccine had the lowest level of developing infection decease. However, there were two major problems: the relatively high rate of incidents of encephalitis (1:10,000) and lack of absolute protection from infection in endemic regions.

References

Flaviviruses